The Commonwealth of Dominica is represented at the 2006 Commonwealth Games in Melbourne by a contingent comprising sportspersons and officials.

Medals

Nations at the 2006 Commonwealth Games
2006 in Dominica sport
Dominica at the Commonwealth Games